Horace Ford may refer to:

 Hod Ford (1897–1977), baseball player
 Horace A. Ford (1822–1880), target archer